Truss's Island is a small island in the River Thames in England, between Staines-upon-Thames and Laleham.  The uninhabited island is publicly accessible across two footbridges from the right (western) bank of the Thames and is landscaped with grass, trees and shrubs.

The island is named after Charles Truss, who improved the navigation of this section of the Thames while working for the City of London in the late 18th century. He is an ancestor of former British Prime Minister Liz Truss.

See also
Islands in the River Thames

References

Islands of the River Thames
Parks and open spaces in Surrey
Uninhabited islands of England

Liz Truss